Wintersleep is the eponymous debut album by Canadian indie rock band Wintersleep, released in 2003 on Dependent Music.

Track listing
All songs written by Wintersleep with additional vocals by Stacy Ricker on the track "Wind".

Credits
Paul Murphy – vocals and acoustic guitars
Loel Campbell – drums
Tim D'Eon – guitars
Jud Haynes – bass guitar
James R. Shaw – recording engineer + original mix and mastering (2003)
Laurence Currie – re-mixing
Noah Mintz – re-mastering
Stacy Ricker – backing vocals

References

2003 debut albums
Wintersleep albums